2000 in television may refer to:

2000 in American television
2000 in Australian television
2000 in Austrian television
2000 in Belgian television
2000 in Brazilian television
2000 in British television
2000 in Canadian television
2000 in Croatian television
2000 in Danish television
2000 in Dutch television
2000 in Estonian television
2000 in French television
2000 in German television
2000 in Irish television
2000 in Italian television
2000 in Japanese television
2000 in New Zealand television
2000 in Philippine television
2000 in Portuguese television
2000 in Scottish television
2000 in South African television
2000 in Spanish television
2000 in Swedish television